Polygamous unions, specifically polygynous unions, are legal in the island nation of the Maldives, though such unions have been reported to be uncommon.  Fifty-nine polygamous marriages took place in 1998.  Polygamy is also specifically covered by a 2001 Maldivian law, which orders courts to assess a man's finances before letting him take another wife.

References

Society of the Maldives
Maldives